Sebastian Roche Ferreira (born 10 February 1994) is a South African-born international rugby union player for . His regular position is lock or flanker.

Club rugby

2010–2014: Western Province

Ferreira was born in Cape Town and started playing rugby at primary school level, aged 10. He attended Paarl Boys' High School, where he was first selected to represent local provincial union Western Province at the Under-16 Grant Khomo Week in 2010. He scored tries in victories over the Lions and Blue Bulls in the tournament and was chosen to represent Western Province in the Under-18 Craven Week tournaments in both 2011 and 2012. In 2012, he was also called into the  squad that played in the Under-19 Provincial Championship, making several appearances as a replacement. This included appearances in the semi-final, where Western Province beat the Golden Lions 24–14, and the final, where Ferreira helped his team become champions with a 22–18 victory over the Blue Bulls, an experience that he described in 2015 as the "best moment of his career".

He returned in 2013 as the side attempted to retain their title; he started eight of their matches and scored a try against the Golden Lions, but his team had a disappointing season, finishing in fifth position to miss out on the title play-offs.

Ferreira progressed to Under-21 level in 2014 and started in four of their matches in the Under-21 Provincial Championship. The team finished top of the log and eventually reached the final, where they were beaten by the Blue Bulls, but Ferreira didn't feature in the latter stages of the competition.

2014–2015: England / Hamiltons

After the 2014 season, Ferreira went to England to have trials with English Premiership. He was named on the Saracens bench for their match against Ospreys in the 2014–15 LV Cup and played several trial matches for the Newcastle Falcons in the Aviva A League. These proved to be successful and he was awarded academy contract for the 2015–16 season.

At the start of 2015, he played club rugby for Hamiltons in the 2015 SARU Community Cup. He started in all seven of their matches in the competition, scoring tries against Sishen in their first match of the competition and Despatch in their final match, the third-place play-off, which Hamiltons won 66–40 to secure third position in the competition.

2015–2016: Newcastle Falcons / Darlington Mowden Park

He then returned to England to take up his academy contract with the Newcastle Falcons, also signing a dual registration with fellow North East side Darlington Mowden Park, playing in National League 1. He made fourteen appearances for the team during the 2015–16 season, scoring tries in matches against Ampthill and Cinderford.

He remained with Darlington Mowden Park throughout his time in England and never made an appearance for the Newcastle Falcons at senior level.

2016: Eastern Province Kings

International rugby

2016–present: Germany

Ferreira is eligible to represent  by virtue of having a German mother.

References

Living people
1994 births
Rugby union players from Cape Town
South African expatriate rugby union players
South African rugby union players
South African people of German descent
South African people of Portuguese descent
German people of Portuguese descent
Rugby union locks
Rugby union flankers
Eastern Province Elephants players
Germany international rugby union players
South African expatriate sportspeople in Germany
Expatriate rugby union players in Germany